May Riley Smith (May 27, 1842 – January 14, 1927) was an American poet and clubwoman.

Biography
May (or Mary) Louise Riley was born on May 27, 1842 in Rochester, New York. She attended Brockport Collegiate Institute. She married Albert Smith, of Springfield, Illinois, a bridge engineer, on March 31, 1869, and they had one son.

Soon, they removed to New York City, where Smith belonged to several literary and social clubs during her life. She was the president of the Sorosis Club from 1911 to 1915 and the club's honorary president from 1919 until her death in 1927. She was also a member of the Poetry Club, Daughters of the American Revolution, the Meridian Club, the Barnard Club, and the MacDowell Club.

Her published books are A Gift of Gentians and Other Verses (New York, 1882), and The Inn of Rest (1888). Among the best and most popular of her poems are "Tired Mothers," "If We Knew," "The Easter Moon," " Love is Sweeter than Rest" and "My Prayer." Among those that have been published separately as booklets are "His Name" and "Sometime". Many of her poems were devotional and were reprinted in hymn books. Her poems were also published in magazines such as Harper's Magazine.

Smith died in Manhattan on January 14, 1927.

Notes

References

Attribution

External links

 
 May Riley Smith at the Online Books Page

1842 births
1927 deaths
People from Rochester, New York
American women poets
Clubwomen
19th-century American poets
Wikipedia articles incorporating text from A Woman of the Century
Daughters of the American Revolution people
19th-century American women